Reddyanus navaiae is a species of scorpion in the family Buthidae.

References

Animals described in 1998
navaiae